Barbie in A Christmas Carol is a 2008 computer-animated Christmas film directed by William Lau and produced by Mattel Entertainment with Rainmaker Entertainment. It was given a limited theatrical release by Kidtoon Films on November 1, 2008. It was later released to DVD on November 4, 2008, and it made its television premiere on Nick Jr. UK on December 23, 2011. The fourteenth entry in the Barbie film series, it is based on Charles Dickens's 1843 novel and features the voice of Kelly Sheridan as Barbie, with Morwenna Banks as Eden Starling (a female version of Ebenezer Scrooge played by Barbie).

Official description 
"Barbie in A Christmas Carol is a heart-warming adaptation of the classic Dickens story filled with cherished Christmas carols, fabulous fashions and lots of laughs! The tale stars Barbie as Eden Starling the glamorous singing diva of a theatre in Victorian London. Along with her snooty cat, Chuzzlewit, Eden selfishly plans to make all the theatre performers stay and rehearse on Christmas Day! Not even Eden's costume designer and childhood friend, Catherine can talk Eden out of her self-centered tantrum. It's up to three very unusual Christmas Spirits to take Eden on a fantastical holiday journey that will open her heart to the spirit of the season and the joy of giving. Barbie in A Christmas Carol is a family favorite to enjoy every holiday season!"

Plot
The story is told by Barbie to her little sister Kelly; who is reluctant to go to a Christmas Eve charity ball instead of spending the holiday at home with family.

Eden Starling is the glamorous, star soprano and owner of the Gads Hill Theatre in Victorian London; as well as an arrogant, self-centered diva with a hatred for Christmas. She is frequently accompanied by her snooty cat, Chuzzlewit. The theater's employees—Freddy, a stage magician; twin ballerinas Ann and Nan; clown Maurice; and costume designer Catherine Beadnell—are reprimanded by Eden for their festive moods, and she declares that they are to work on Christmas day, ruining their holiday plans. Catherine, Eden's childhood best friend, tries to convince her otherwise to no avail.

That night, Eden is visited by the ghost of her late Aunt Marie (the film's version of Jacob Marley), bound by the chains forged from her misdeeds in life. Marie warns Eden that her actions are leading her down the same path as her aunt and that she will be visited by three spirits in an attempt to help her change her ways.

Eden is first visited by the cheery Spirit of Christmas Past who takes Eden back in time to her childhood. As a young girl, Eden was forced to study music under the domineering Aunt Marie with little rest. Eden secretly sneaks out of the house to celebrate Christmas with Catherine and her family. The festivities are interrupted at the arrival of an enraged Marie. After the incident, Eden was forbidden from celebrating Christmas and Marie further instilled her self-centered views into her niece.

Eden is visited next by the jolly Spirit of Christmas Present. The Spirit takes Eden to the theatre where she learns of the other performers' disdain for her. The Spirit then shows Eden that Catherine is visiting a local orphanage. Catherine generously gifts them clothes and is particularly close to a crippled orphan named Tammy (the film's version of Tiny Tim). Eden's heart softens after witnessing the scene but becomes concerned when the owner tells Catherine that the orphanage will be likely be closed due to a lack of funding.

Finally, Eden is visited by the mysterious yet kindly Spirit of Christmas future. Eden is shocked to find her future-self living in poverty. The Spirit explains that Eden had fired her employees, including Catherine, after they'd showed up late one Christmas. Afterwards, the acts hired by Eden to replace them failed to impress audiences, leading to Eden losing her fame and fortune. Eden visits Catherine, who is now an accomplished fashion designer, at her new store for help. Catherine explains that after Eden fired her, she left the country to find work. Returning months later, financially stable and ready to adopt Tammy, she is dismayed to find the orphanage closed and the children gone. Since then, Catherine has become disillusioned with Christmas, focusing only on advancing her career and even adopting Eden's selfish outlook on life and treating her workers cruelly. Catherine then refuses to aid the impoverished Eden and throws her out of her shop.

Horrified, Eden begs the spirits for another chance to redeem herself and alter the future; after which she awakens back in her bedroom on Christmas morning. Filled with newfound joy, Eden arrives at the theater and gives gifts to all her employees as well as allowing them to take the holiday off, which changes their outlook on her. At Eden's urging, Catherine takes her to the orphanage, which Eden promises to financially support herself. Freddy arrives with a carriage—which the spirits magically turn into a sleigh for it to move through the snow—and Catherine and Eden ride off with him to spend Christmas with Catherine's family. The orphan's wave them goodbye, joined by the unseen ghost of Aunt Marie, now free of her chains.

The story instills Kelly with a new sense of generosity. Barbie's friend Nikki comes in to remind them they are late and Barbie and Kelly leave for the event.

Voice cast

Promotion 
To promote the film, an exclusive interview for Amazon.com featuring Barbie (voiced by Kelly Sheridan) was released, called "Barbie Talks About Her Holiday Movie".

DVD Sales
The film was released on November 4, 2008 and grossed $6,626,008 in the U.S. DVD market.

Adaptation
Based on the 1843 book A Christmas Carol by Charles Dickens, the film was adapted into a story book written by Mary Man-Kong and published by Golden Books (a division of Random House).

See also 
 List of Christmas films
 Adaptations of A Christmas Carol
 Barbie (media franchise)
 Barbie in the Nutcracker
 Mickey's Christmas Carol
 A Christmas Carol, 2009 film

References

External links
 , barbie.com site
 
 
 Random House page
 Golden Book page

2008 films
American computer-animated films
Barbie films
Films set in the 2000s
Canadian computer-animated films
American animated feature films
Canadian animated feature films
Films set in England
Films set in London
Films set in the 19th century
American Christmas films
2000s American films
2000s Canadian films
Animated Christmas films
Canadian Christmas films